John Jansen (born October 27, 1947) was a Canadian politician. He served in the Legislative Assembly of British Columbia from 1987 to 1991, as a Social Credit member for the constituency of Chilliwack.

He served in the governments of Bill Vander Zalm and Rita Johnston, serving as Minister of Finance in the latter and as Minister of Health in the former.

He served as Mayor of Chilliwack in the 1980s. He is currently the President of the Chilliwack Hospital Foundation.

References

1947 births
British Columbia Social Credit Party MLAs
Canadian people of Dutch descent
Finance ministers of British Columbia
Health ministers of British Columbia
Living people
Mayors of Chilliwack
Members of the Executive Council of British Columbia
People from Chilliwack